Gianluca Mager was the defending champion but chose not to defend his title.

Giulio Zeppieri won the title after defeating Flavio Cobolli 6–1, 3–6, 6–3 in the final.

Seeds

Draw

Finals

Top half

Bottom half

References

External links
Main draw
Qualifying draw

Open Città della Disfida - 1
2021 Singles